Henry Bogdan (born February 4, 1961 in Riverside, California) is an American musician. He is perhaps best known as the original bass guitarist and a founding member of the alternative metal band Helmet. Henry Bodgan played bass for all of Helmet's albums released up until 1997 which  included Strap It On, Meantime, Betty, and Aftertaste.

After Helmet broke up in 1998, Bogdan remained active in music but has largely moved away from the hard rock/metal scene. Now focusing on pedal steel and lap steel guitars, Bogdan has made guest appearances in a number of musically diverse bands, including playing the song "Ramblin' Man" with Hank Williams III for The Melvins' album The Crybaby. He worked extensively with The Moonlighters, a Hawaiian steel guitar/jazz band that played very frequently in New York City. Bodgan also played lap steel on several songs on Bahamut, the debut album of the group Hazmat Modine.

Bogdan lives in Portland, Oregon and was playing with the Midnight Serenaders. He hasn't been present in the music industry since leaving the Midnight Serenaders.

External links
Helmet
Artist Spotlight on Henry Bogdan
Midnight Serenaders

1961 births
Living people
American rock bass guitarists
Noise rock musicians
Post-hardcore musicians
Helmet (band) members
Musicians from Portland, Oregon
Guitarists from Oregon
American male bass guitarists
Alternative metal bass guitarists
20th-century American bass guitarists
20th-century American male musicians